Tian Ruining (born 17 January 1997) is a Chinese speed skater. She competed in the 2018 Winter Olympics.

References

External links
 

1997 births
Living people
Speed skaters at the 2018 Winter Olympics
Speed skaters at the 2022 Winter Olympics
Chinese female speed skaters
Olympic speed skaters of China